Sar Bagh-e Shah Hormozd (also Romanized as Sar Bāgh-e Shāh Hormozd; also known as Āsīāb-e Shāh Teymūr, Sar Bāgh-e Shāh Hormoz, Shāh Hormoz, and Shahormoz; and Anglicized to Taimur's Garden) is a village in Vahdat Rural District, in the Central District of Zarand County, Kerman Province, Iran. At the 2006 census, its population was 144, in 40 families.

References 

Populated places in Zarand County